The Maldives International is an open international badminton tournament in Maldives organized by the Badminton Association of Maldives and sanctioned by the Badminton Asia Confederation and Badminton World Federation. This tournament has been an International Challenge level before it went into hiatus in 2014. This tournament held at the Malé sports complex, and offered world ranking points with total prize money US$15,000.

In 2010, India won two titles from the men's and women's singles event. Anand Pawar won the men's singles title after defeated Dinuka Karunaratne of Sri Lanka with the score 21–14, 21–18, while his compatriot Trupti Murgunde won the women's singles title after Ann Venice Alcala Malvinne of Philippines retired with a hamstring injury at the score 21–10, 11–3. The men's doubles title goes to Pakistani Kashif Ali Sulehri and Rizwan Azam, and the Japanese pair Chinami Okui and Yukie Sumida won the women's doubles title. Kennevic Asuncion and Karyn Velez won the mixed doubles title outlasted Sri Lanka's Udara Nayanajith and Renu Chandrika Hettiarachchige, 24–22, 17–21, 21–13.

In 2011, Pablo Abián of Spain with his fast movement on the court, excellent physics, and speed of strokes managed to win the men's singles title. The 15 years old, P. V. Sindhu produced a stunning performance to win the women's singles title. She beat Carolina Marin in the third round and Agnese Allegrini in the semi-final. The men's, women's, and mixed doubles title goes to Singapore (Ashton Chen Yong Zhao and Derek Wong Zi Liang), Japan (Miki Komori and Nao Miyoshi) and Canada (Toby Ng and Grace Gao) respectively.

In 2012, K. Srikanth emerged as the title winner by ending the men's singles final set in three games with a margin of 13–21, 21–11 and 21–16 of Zulfadli Zulkiffli. Japan won three titles from the women's singles, men's doubles and women's doubles event. Raj Popat of Wales and Devi Tika Permatasari of Indonesia emerged as the winner of the mixed doubles title after defeating Sri Lanka’s Hasitha Chanaka and Kavindi Ishandika Sirimannage.

In 2013, Indonesia managed to put 6 representatives in the final round, and won two titles in the men's singles and women's doubles event after created All Indonesian finals. Hanna Ramadini lost to Michelle Li of Canada in the women's singles final and Arya Maulana Aldiartama/Alfian Eko Prasetya defeated by the Taiwanese pair Tien Tzu-chieh and Wang Chi-lin. Indian pair K. Nandagopal and Maneesha Kukkapalli clinched the mixed doubles title after registering a straight-game victory over Kim Dae-sung and Oh Bo-kyung of South Korea.

Previous winners

International Challenge

International Series

Future Series

Performances by nation

Maldives International Challenge

Maldives Future Series

References

External links
 Badminton Association of Maldives

Badminton tournaments
Badminton tournaments in the Maldives
Recurring sporting events established in 2010